38 athletes (32 men and 6 women) from Belgium competed at the 1996 Summer Paralympics in Atlanta, United States.

Medallists

See also
Belgium at the Paralympics
Belgium at the 1996 Summer Olympics

References 

Nations at the 1996 Summer Paralympics
1996
Summer Paralympics